Instinct is the second album of Japanese rock band, Granrodeo. It was released on 26 September 2008.

Song information 
 "Heaven" was used as the ending theme to the 2007 anime television series Kotetsushin Jeeg.
 "delight song" - The band's first non tie-up Maxi-single.
 "Not for Sale" was used as the theme to the 2008 Game  "Duel Love".
  was used as the opening theme to the 2008 anime television series Blassreiter.
 "Darlin'" - a Single cut on December 10 the same year..

Track listing

Personnel 
 Kishow: vocals, lyrics
 E-Zuka: lead guitar, backing vocals, Arranging

Charts

References
Official mobile site
『Instinct』ランティス紹介ページ

2008 albums
Granrodeo albums